Bromus alopecuros is a species of brome grass known by the common name weedy brome.

It is native to the Mediterranean Basin, and it is known in other places, including Australia, South Africa, and California, as an introduced species and sometimes a weed. It is an annual grass producing stems up to 83 centimeters tall. The inflorescence is a dense packet of spikelets with tangling, curved awns.

External links
Jepson Manual Treatment
USDA Plants Profile
Photo gallery

alopecuros
Flora of Malta